La Quotidienne is a French television magazine programme devoted to consumer affairs, broadcast live from 30 September 2013 on France 5 from Monday to Friday, initially at 12:00, then at 11:45 from 10 February 2014. It is presented by Maya Lauqué and Thomas Isle.

A second series was announced for September 2014, following a summer "Best-Of" run.

Concept
This programme is devoted to new forms of consumption, whether collaborative, supportive or economic. Surrounded by reporters, Lauqué and Isle are interested in initiatives and experiments implemented in these areas. The show is presented on a TV tray located near the headquarters of France 5 Vanves in Hauts-de-Seine.

The chief editor is Sylvie Cenci.

It occupies the lunch time slot, previously used for the children's strand Zouzous (now shown only in the morning) on France 5.

Columnists
 Madeleine Ably
 Laetitia Barlerin, veterinary section
 Fabien Bordu, in matters of money and wealth
 Farida, kitchen
 Valerie Durier for consumption
 Philippe Gaudin, for consolidated information
 Gérard Michel, lawyer
 Charlotte Savreux, for testing products

Sequences

Current sequence
 Helper: new sequence on home carers.
 Consolidated information: the current information on consumption, the economy etc.. Philippe Gaudin has a consolidated info every day.
 Record of the day: the experts and witnesses who are invited on the show answer questions from viewers.
 Test Bench (Monday and Friday): Charlotte Savreux tests food or medical products with columnists.
 Favourite food (Tuesday and Thursday): Farida shows recipes for cooking ideas.
 Miss veto (Wednesdays only): Veterinary sequence by Laetitia Barlerin.
 Case study: columnists answer questions from viewers.

Former sequences
 2.0 Conso: old sequence on consumption 2.0 with Madeleine Ably.
 C'est déja demain: old news sequence with Philippe Gaudin.

Audiences
After market shares below 1% at the launch of the show, La Quotidienne gradually gained audience with peaks of 180,000 and 200,000 viewers from the beginning of 2014, respectively, 1.5% and 2% audience share.

See also
 Consumption

References

2013 French television series debuts
2010s French television series